Andhra Cricket Association (ACA) is the governing body of Cricket in the Indian state of Andhra Pradesh. The association is affiliated to the Board of Control for Cricket in India and governs the Andhra cricket team. The association was founded in 1953 and has been affiliated to the BCCI ever since. The ACA operates the Dr. Y. S. Rajasekhara Reddy International Cricket Stadium, in Visakhapatnam, which hosts International level Test, ODI and T20 Cricket matches. The Head Quarters of Andhra Cricket Association is in its Executive Capital,  Visakhapatnam, Andhra Pradesh

History

Maharajkumar of Vizianagram was the founder President of the Andhra Cricket Association and Uttar Pradesh Cricket Association. He was the Indian cricket team Captain and batsman in the 1930s. In the 1960s he was the Indian Cricket Commentator.

The ACA has produced  international players namely Mannava Prasad and Venugopal Rao . Many players from the ACA have played for India U-19s including D Sivakumar, Gnaneshwar Rao (Captained India U19s), GVS Prasad, Bodapati Sumanth and more recently Ricky Bhui.

Grounds

See also 
Andhra Pradesh cricket team

References

Cricket administration in India
Cricket in Andhra Pradesh
1953 establishments in India
Sports organizations established in 1953